International Journal of Transitional Justice is an interdisciplinary peer-reviewed academic journal published triannually by Oxford University Press to provide a forum for transitional justice as an academic discipline in its own right. It was established in 2007 and the editors-in-chief are M. Brinton Lykes (Boston College) and Hugo van der Merwe (Centre for the Study of Violence and Reconciliation, South Africa).

Abstracting and indexing 
The journal is abstracted and indexed in:
 Google Scholar
 International Bibliography of the Social Sciences (IBSS)
 SCOPUS
 Social Sciences Citation Index 

According to the Journal Citation Reports, the journal has a 2015 impact factor of 1.250, ranking it 49th out of 163 journals in the category "Political Science", 25th out of 86 journals in the category "International Relations" and 45th out of 147 journals in the category "Law".

See also 
 List of international relations journals
 List of law journals
 List of political science journals

References

External links 
 

English-language journals
International relations journals
Law journals
Oxford University Press academic journals
Political science journals
Publications established in 2007
Triannual journals